St. Joseph's Roman Catholic Church is a historic church at 86 Hope Street in Providence, Rhode Island within the Diocese of Providence.

Description
St. Joseph's  was designed by the noted Irish-born architect, Patrick C. Keely and built in 1851–53.  It is a large rectangular structure with a steeply pitched gable roof, and a square tower protruding from the front facade.  It is faced in ashlar stone with brownstone trim.  The sides are supported in part by buttresses.  The building is the oldest Roman Catholic Church built of stone in the state. St. Mary's Church, a wood-frame structure dating to 1844 in the Crompton section of the town of West Warwick, is the oldest Catholic church in Rhode Island.

The church was listed on the National Register of Historic Places in 1974.

Broadway actor and dancer George M. Cohan was baptized at the church in 1878.

See also
 Catholic Church in the United States
 Catholic parish church
 Index of Catholic Church articles
National Register of Historic Places listings in Providence, Rhode Island
 Pastoral care

References

External links 

Official site of the Holy See
 http://stjosephprovidence.org/ Official site of St. Joseph Church, Providence

Roman Catholic churches completed in 1851
Churches in the Roman Catholic Diocese of Providence
Patrick Keely buildings
Churches on the National Register of Historic Places in Rhode Island
19th-century Roman Catholic church buildings in the United States
Churches in Providence, Rhode Island
Roman Catholic churches in Rhode Island
1851 establishments in Rhode Island
National Register of Historic Places in Providence, Rhode Island